Lopez is an American semi-autobiographical single-camera sitcom television series created by John Altschuler, Dave Krinsky and Jeff Stilson, starring George Lopez. TV Land gave a 12-episode straight-to-series order in August 2015. The series premiered on TV Land on March 30, 2016. On June 3, 2016, TV Land renewed Lopez for a second season.

On November 16, 2017, the series was cancelled after two seasons.

Premise
The series follows a semi-fictionalized version of George Lopez and his day-to-day life, as he balances being a stand-up comedian while dealing with interpersonal relationships and trying to stay true to his roots in the Latino community. He also struggles to adjust to being a celebrity in a world where social media is his worst enemy.

The first season finds George working with new manager Olly, who helps him pursue a residency show in Las Vegas. The second season involves George and Olly trying to pitch a new detective show called Valleys to networks.

Cast and characters

Main
 George Lopez as George Lopez
 Anthony "CiTRiC" Campos as Manolo, George's driver and confidante
 Maronzio Vance as Maronzio, George's friend and fellow stand-up comedian who is frequently his opening act
 Hayley Huntley as Olivia "Olly" Michaels, George's social media-savvy manager
 James Michael Connor as Stephen (season 1), George's nosy and annoying neighbor
 Ashley Zamora as Erica Lopez (season 1), George's teenage daughter
 Ray Diaz as Hector (season 2), Manolo's former cellmate who starts to live with him and George

Recurring
 Alexie Gilmore as Sheila, George's brief love interest (season 1)
 Zeke Nicholson as Gabrielo del Santo, an image consultant who works with Olly (season 1)
 Jacqueline Obradors as Alita, George's real estate agent (season 1)
 Austin Mincks as Tiddlypie, a rival comedian (season 1)
 Virginia Montero as Manolo's mom
 Gwen Holloway as Olly and Pfeiffer's mom
 Rain Valdez as Coco, a transgender actor slated to be the female lead for George's detective show (season 2)
 Natalie Lander as Rachel Naismith, a young TV producer (season 2)
 Laura Ashley Samuels as Pfeiffer, Olly's immature younger sister who is clearly their mother's favorite (season 2)
 Luenell as Miss Wendy, Manolo's GED teacher and love interest (season 2)
 Gillian Vigman as Lori Strahan, owner of a billion-dollar TV shopping network and George's love interest (season 2)

Series overview

Episodes

Season 1 (2016)

Season 2 (2017)

Reception 
On Rotten Tomatoes, season 1 of Lopez has an aggregate score of 73% based on 8 positive and 3 negative critic reviews.  The website’s consensus reads: "Lopez's namesake star wrings enough cheeky, autobiographical humor to transcend the show's old-school premise."

References

External links
 
 

2010s American single-camera sitcoms
2016 American television series debuts
2017 American television series endings
English-language television shows
TV Land original programming
Television shows set in Los Angeles
Television series by 3 Arts Entertainment
Television series created by John Altschuler
Television series created by Dave Krinsky